Tarmo may refer to:
 Tarmo (given name), Estonian and Finnish masculine given name
 Tarmo, Estonian and Finnish family name
 Ruut Tarmo (1896–1967), Estonian stage and film actor, and stage director
 , a Finnish steam-powered icebreaker
 , a Finnish Taisto-class motor torpedo boat sunk on 21 June 1944
 Hämeenlinnan Tarmo, a Finnish sports club